Pierre de Gaillande is a French-born American singer, guitarist and composer. In the early 1990s, de Gaillande played trumpet in San Diego hardcore band Creedle, bass in New York power pop bands The Morning Glories and southern California indie band Film Star, as well as touring and recording with Atlantic recording artist C. Gibbs. He founded the band Melomane in 1998 as guitarist and lead singer. Melomane made three full-length studio albums and toured extensively in Europe. De Gaillande founded the band Sea Foxx in 2003, which featured former Skeleton Key drummer Steve Calhoon. De Gaillande was one of two founding members of the rock band The Snow, along with singer/pianist Hilary Downes. In 2010, he released the album Bad Reputation: Pierre de Gaillande Sings Georges Brassens, in which he covered songs by French songwriter and poet Georges Brassens and translated the lyrics from French to English. De Gaillande says he first became interested in Brassens' music as a child, when his father played it very loudly in their home. A second album of Georges Brassens in English entitled Bad Reputation Volume 2 was released in 2014. In 2019, de Gaillande released an album of French versions of American punk and indie songs entitled franglais.

Film and Dance Composition 
In 2004, de Gaillande collaborated with Gary Greenblatt to compose and perform a live score for Supernatural Return to Love, a dance piece by Uruguayan choreographer Luciana Achugar. In 2006, de Gaillande composed the score for feature documentary Dr. Bronner's Magic Soapbox, directed by Sara Lamm. In 2007 he scored the short film The Perfect Dress, directed by Rose Viggiano.

Critical reception
Robert Christgau gave Bad Reputation an A− grade. In his review, he wrote that "Brassens was the rare music-second guy whose verbal blueprints laid out melodies that stand up on their own, and de Gaillande's diligence about following their syllabic patterns preserves tunes that will snake through your head days later." Scott Branson of PopMatters gave the album a 7 out of 10 rating, and described the album as "a great homage" but also said that "something of the joviality of Brassens is lost in de Gaillande’s renditions." Chris Nickson of AllMusic gave the album a rating of 4 out of 5 stars, and described the album as "all delightfully cynical and world-weary, with plenty of wit."

Discography

References

French emigrants to the United States
American rock guitarists
American rock singers
Living people
Year of birth missing (living people)